Youssef Guezoum (was born on July 31, 1975) is a Los Angeles-based Moroccan-American-Belgian film music composer, orchestrator, and sound designer. His credits include scores for the Power Rangers, Saban Entertainment (working with Noam Kaniel), and Frenchy Movie directed by Jean-Claude Van Damme. Many soundtracks from his music library were used in film, TV, games, and trailers by major studios in Hollywood. This list includes productions by Paramount Pictures, Universal Music, Lion’s Gate, as well as CSI:Miami, Secret & Lies, Hell's Kitchen, PGA Tour, Ultimate Justice. He is also a member of Oticons film composers agency.
Born in Marrakech, Morocco, a colorful melting-pot city with many musical influences, including the folk music of the Atlas mountains, African music (like Gnawa's), as well as Andalusian (Moorish) music. This rich musical atmosphere gave birth to his love  for music. When He was 10 years old he learned to play guitar and became the bassist of a rock fusion band  created with a group of friends. They named their band "The Marrakech" to honor the city that inspired us so much.
Along with music he also have a passion for movies. When He was a young boy he went to the movies with my friends to watch action, suspense, war and adventure movies. He was completely blown away by the music that took him into a compelling imaginary world.
Graduated from Academy of Music in Brussels, Belgium with a focus on piano. Subsequently, He flew to Canada and worked at Creative Future, the prestigious production company that created the sound design for Terminator 2: Judgment Day and Harry Potter, among many others.
When composing for film, He try to create music that faithfully captures the emotion that the filmmaker wants to express.
Thank to his diverse musical background and his deep knowledge of Western musical tradition.
He is able to uniquely combine music genres for many platforms, including television, video games, cartoons, corporate videos, advertising and commercials.

Early life
Guezoum was born in Marrakesh, Morocco in 1975. After completing his high school, he moved to Canada where he studied sound engineering at Vancouver Film School. In 1996, he relocated to Brussels where he studied classical music for 4 years and received his academic degree from Académie de Musique, Bruxelles.  He moved to Los Angeles in 2013.

Career
Guezoum started playing guitar at the early age of 10. He pursued his master's degree with the famous American composer, Hummie Mann. He is known for his music which draws from elements of middle eastern music, gnawa music and folk music.

In 2009, he collaborated with Noureddine Zerrad, a Belgian director and produced music for his short film Tension. He also produced music for Van Damme and Claudia Bassols starrer movie Soldiers in 2010.

In 2012, He collaborated with Guillaume Didier for another Arabic film War Game.

He composed music for Full Love directed by Jean-Claude Van Damme in 2014. He has also produced music for Mark Dacascos starrer Ultimate Justice which is slated to release in 2016.

Filmography
Frenchy (2021)
Mazagan La Legende Daicha (2020)
Power Rangers Hyperforce (2019)
Power Rangers Ninja Steel (2018)
Route 66 (2018)
Ultimate Justice (2016)
Ankh (2015)
Full Love (2014)
War Game (2013)
Beb El Fella - Le Cinemonde (2013)
 The Amityville Asylum (2013)
Where My Heart Is (2013)
Daylight (2013)
Chaala (2012)
Motorhome (2012)
Casa Riders (2011)
My Basement (2010)
Ahmed Gassiaux (2010)
Soldiers (2010)
Tension (2009)

References

External links
 
 Youssef Guezoum on Oticons Film Composers Agency

Living people
1975 births
Musicians from Los Angeles County, California
Moroccan composers
Moroccan emigrants to Canada
Moroccan emigrants to the United States
People from Marrakesh
20th-century Moroccan musicians
21st-century Moroccan musicians